"Nature of the Beast" is the first episode of the ninth season of the American police procedural drama NCIS, and the 187th episode overall. It originally aired on CBS in the United States on September 20, 2011. The episode is written by Gary Glasberg and directed by Tony Wharmby, and was seen by 19.96 million viewers.

In the episode, Special agent Tony DiNozzo is shot and unable to remember what it all was about. He must work together with Special agent Leroy Jethro Gibbs and Dr. Rachel Cranston to identify the attacker.

Scott Wolf is introduced as FBI agent Stratton, while Matthew Willig's NCIS Special agent Simon Cade is shot dead.

Plot
Special Agent Tony DiNozzo awakens in a hospital after an incident which left him with a gunshot wound, severe head trauma and injuries. Dr. Rachel Cranston, sister of deceased NCIS Special Agent Caitlin Todd, comes to talk and together they piece together Tony's history. Set over the course of several months, the episode follows a series of events surrounding the investigation given to Tony by SECNAV Clayton Jarvis (Matt Craven) in "Pyramid". Secretary Jarvis assigned Tony to investigate an unknown target within NCIS as a possible leak of classified intel, and the rest of the team does their best to try and figure out who the target is after Tony destroys the only photo.

After Dr. Donald "Ducky" Mallard discovers security footage of now former Special Agent Erica Jane "EJ" Barrett removing a microchip from the body of Special Agent Gayne Levin, suspicion falls on her, and even more so when Navy Captain Felix Wright, a personal friend of Jarvis, dies in the latter's arms, having an incision in his arm in the same place as Levin. The team discover the microchips provide access to a classified Navy fleet, known as the 'Watchers', and that Levin and Wright are both former Office of Naval Intelligence members assigned to the fleet. Whilst Tony and Rachel are talking, FBI Agent Casey Stratton tries to get Tony alone but backs off twice: first Gibbs sends him away and then when Stratton gets into Tony's room, he leaves when he realizes Rachel is calling Gibbs.

The Major Case Response Team begin to suspect EJ is the target of Tony's investigation when ONI's Director of Special Operations Sean Latham reveals the chips are part of a project called 'Phantom Eight', and they give the holder immediate access to highly classified data. Latham and Jarvis suspect EJ stole the chips to sell them, but EJ confides to Tony that Levin asked her to remove the microchip if he were ever killed and return it to Wright. Tony is lured to a meeting with EJ and her buyer, revealed to be Barrett's other team member and the target of Tony's investigation: Special Agent Simon Cade. Although Cade claims that he was framed, all three are shot during the meeting. Cade is killed, Tony is knocked unconscious, and Barrett is missing.

As Tony recalls the meeting, he realizes they were set up by the shooter, who he recalls to be Stratton. Unfortunately Vance discovers FBI Agent Stratton doesn't exist, and they have no idea who orchestrated everything. Latham takes the microchip and meets with Stratton, revealed to be his partner and the one in possession of Wrights microchip, as they place the microchips up for auction. At the end of the episode, Gibbs goes through files left for him by Mike Franks, one of which is the classified 'Phantom Eight' file which has a photo of eight men, who Gibbs sees include Gayne Levin, Felix Wright, Sean Latham and Casey Stratton.

Production
"Nature of the Beast" is written by Gary Glasberg and directed by Tony Wharmby. Glasberg thought about the main storyline at a hotel in Las Vegas, ending up with the idea involving Special agents Simon Cade, Gayne Levin, Erica Jane "EJ" Barrett and Tony DiNozzo: "Cade is the one in the picture, but he didn't do it. The audience needs to think EJ is the one in the photo, but she isn't the traitor either. Yes, she took the microchip from Levin, but what if she did it for well-intentioned reasons? What if the whole thing was a set-up?" About how to make Tony remember, "why not bring Dr. Rachel Cranston back? She could help Tony remember what he'd done. She and Gibbs could help him put the pieces together", Glasberg say. "I knew [...] Tony, EJ and Cade needed to all be innocent pawns in someone else's larger plan. And that's how Stratton and Latham (Scott Wolf and Phil Casnoff) were born. New villains for an exciting new season".

The episode includes a lot of recurring characters, some for the first time and some for the last time. Jimmy Palmer (Brian Dietzen), E. J. Barrett (Sarah Jane Morris), Rachel Cranston (Wendy Makkena) and Clayton Jarvis (Matt Craven) continue their participation on NCIS, while Scott Wolf's Casey Stratton is shown for the first time. Matthew Willig ends his recurring role as Special agent Simon Cade.

The arc between FBI agent Stratton, EJ Barrett and Tony DiNozzo continues in the episode "Housekeeping".

Tony's reference to Angels with Dirty Faces is incorrect. He attributes the Priest's (Pat O'Brien) role to Humphrey Bogart, who portrayed the crooked lawyer in that film.  This may have been a deliberate error due to Tony's mental state in the episode.

Reception
"Nature of the Beast" was seen by 19.96 million live viewers following its broadcast on September 20, 2011, with a 4.3/12 share among adults aged 18 to 49. A rating point represents one percent of the total number of television sets in American households, a share means the percentage of television sets in use tuned to the program. In total viewers, "Nature of the Beast" easily won NCIS and CBS the night, while the spin-off NCIS: Los Angeles drew second and was seen by 16.11 million viewers. Compared to the last episode "Pyramid", "Nature of the Beast" was up a bit in both viewers and adults 18–49.

Steve Marsi from TV Fanatic gave the episode 4.5 (out of 5) and stated that "the ninth season premiere of NCIS was slower-paced and more complicated than expected, but provided a compelling conclusion to Tony's mole hunt while setting up a new foil, and a new enemy, for Gibbs".

References

2011 American television episodes
NCIS (season 9) episodes